Lake Ditch Bridge is a historic plate girder bridge located in Monroe Township, Morgan County, Indiana.  It was built in 1895 by the Chicago Bridge and Iron Co.  It is 58 feet, 6 inches, long and 24 feet, 9 inches wide.  It is supported by timber planks and concrete abutments.

It was listed on the National Register of Historic Places in 2001.

References

Road bridges on the National Register of Historic Places in Indiana
Bridges completed in 1895
Transportation buildings and structures in Morgan County, Indiana
National Register of Historic Places in Morgan County, Indiana
Plate girder bridges in the United States